The list of people from Cumbria, a county in North West England, is divided by local government district. The demonym of Cumbria is Cumbrian.

 
Cumbria
People
Cumbria